Justices of the Supreme Court of the United Kingdom are the judges of the Supreme Court of the United Kingdom other than the president and the deputy president. The Supreme Court is the highest court of the United Kingdom for civil and  criminal matters in the jurisdictions of England and Wales and Northern Ireland. Judges are appointed by the King on the advice of the Prime Minister, who receives recommendations from a selection commission.

The number of judges is set by s.23(2) Constitutional Reform Act 2005, which established the Court, but may be increased by the King through an Order in Council under s.23(3). There are currently 12 positions: one President, one Deputy President, and 10 Justices. Judges of the Court who are not already peers are granted the judicial courtesy title of Lord or Lady.

Qualification
The Constitutional Reform Act 2005 sets out the conditions for the appointments of a President, Deputy President or Justice of the Court. That person must have held high judicial office (judge of the Supreme Court, English High Court or Court of Appeal, Northern Irish High Court or Court of Appeal, or Scottish Court of Session) for at least two years, or have held rights of audience at the higher courts of England, Scotland or Northern Ireland for at least fifteen years. This means it is not necessary for someone applying to become a judge of the Supreme Court to have previous judicial experience (allowing Jonathan Sumption QC, a leading barrister, to successfully apply for the role in 2011).

Appointment
Judges of the Supreme Court are appointed by The King by the issue of letters patent, on the advice of the Prime Minister, to whom a name is recommended by a special selection commission. The Prime Minister is required by the Constitutional Reform Act to recommend this name to the King and not permitted to nominate anyone else.

Selection commission
The selection commission is made up of the President of the Court, another senior UK judge (not a Supreme Court Justice), and a member each from the Judicial Appointments Commission, the Judicial Appointments Board for Scotland and the Northern Ireland Judicial Appointments Commission. By law, at least one of these cannot be a lawyer. Should the President's place on the commission be unfilled, that place is to be taken by the next most senior judge of the court, either the Deputy President or, if they are also vacant, the most senior Justice. However, there is a similar but separate commission to appoint the next President, which is chaired by one of the non-lawyer members and features another Supreme Court Justice in the place of the President. Both of these commissions are convened by the Lord Chancellor.

Selection procedure
Once the commission is formed, there are a number of people it is required to consult. The first group is a set of "senior judges" defined by the Act who do not wish to be considered for nomination. Section 60 of the Act defines "the senior judges" as (a) the other judges of the Supreme Court, (b) the Lord Chief Justice of England and Wales, (c) the Master of the Rolls, (d) the Lord President of the Court of Session, (e) the Lord Chief Justice of Northern Ireland, (f) the Lord Justice Clerk, (g) the President of the King's Bench Division, (h) the President of the Family Division and (i) the Chancellor of the High Court.

In the event that no judge from one of the UK's three jurisdictions has been consulted (e.g. if the Lord President and Lord Justice Clerk, the two most senior judges in Scotland, both wish to be considered for appointment, they will both be excluded from the consultation), the commission must consult the most senior judge in that jurisdiction who is not a member of the commission and does not wish to be considered for appointment. The commission is then also required to consult the Lord Chancellor, the First Minister of Scotland, the First Minister for Wales and the Secretary of State for Northern Ireland.

The selection must be made on merit, in accordance with the qualification criteria of section 25 of the Act (above), of someone not a member of the commission, ensuring that the judges will have between them knowledge and experience of all three of the UK's distinct legal systems, having regard to any guidance given by the Lord Chancellor, and of one person only.

Lord Chancellor's role
Once the commission has selected a nomination to make, this is to be provided in a report to the Lord Chancellor, who is then required to consult the judges and politicians already consulted by the commission before deciding whether to recommend (in the Act, "notify") a name to the Prime Minister, who in turn advises the King to make the appointment. The Act provides for up to three stages in the Lord Chancellor's consideration of whether to do so:
 When the selection is first put forward, the Lord Chancellor is entitled to accept the nomination, to reject it, or to ask the commission to reconsider. 
 If the nomination was rejected in Stage One, the commission must put forward a new name for Stage Two. The Lord Chancellor must either accept or ask the commission to reconsider. If instead the Lord Chancellor asked for reconsideration at Stage One, the commission may either put forward the same name or a new one. In either case, the Lord Chancellor must either accept or reject the name. In other words, the Lord Chancellor has one opportunity to reject and one to ask for reconsideration. 
 At Stage Three (i.e. when the Lord Chancellor has both rejected and asked once for reconsideration), the name put forward by the commission must be accepted and forwarded to the Prime Minister, with one caveat: in the event the commission was asked to reconsider a name and then forwarded a new name, the Lord Chancellor may choose to accept the earlier name.

Original judges
The Supreme Court was established on 1 October 2009. It assumed the former judicial functions of the House of Lords, which were removed by the Constitutional Reform Act 2005. The twelve Lords of Appeal in Ordinary became judges of the Supreme Court, except for Lord Scott of Foscote, who retired the day before the Court began business, and Lord Neuberger of Abbotsbury, who resigned to become Master of the Rolls. The former Master of the Rolls, Lord Clarke of Stone-cum-Ebony, became a judge of the Supreme Court on its first day, the first Justice directly appointed to the Court. Sir John Dyson was appointed as the twelfth member on 13 April 2010; the first Justice not to be a peer.

The Senior Law Lord on 1 October 2009, Lord Phillips of Worth Matravers, became the Court's first President, and the former Second Senior Law Lord, Lord Hope of Craighead, the first Deputy President. The Court originally had one female Justice, Baroness Hale of Richmond; two Scottish Justices, Lord Hope and Lord Rodger of Earlsferry; and one Northern Irish Justice, Lord Kerr of Tonaghmore.

Of the original Justices, Lord Saville of Newdigate was the first to retire,  on 30 September 2010, and Lord Rodger of Earlsferry was the first to die in office, on 26 June 2011. Lord Dyson stood down to become Master of the Rolls on 1 October 2012, the first time a Justice had left the Court to take up another judicial office. The last of the original Justices to retire was The Lord Kerr of Tonaghmore on 30 September 2020.

List

The Lord Phillips of Worth Matravers, first President (retired 30 September 2012)
The Lord Hope of Craighead, first Deputy President (retired 26 June 2013)
The Lord Saville of Newdigate (retired 30 September 2010)
The Lord Rodger of Earlsferry (died in office 26 June 2011)
The Lord Walker of Gestingthorpe (retired 17 March 2013)
The Baroness Hale of Richmond (retired 10 January 2020)

The Lord Brown of Eaton-under-Heywood (retired 9 April 2012)
The Lord Mance (retired 6 June 2018)
The Lord Collins of Mapesbury (retired 7 May 2011)
The Lord Kerr of Tonaghmore (retired 30 September 2020) 
The Lord Clarke of Stone-cum-Ebony (retired 4 September 2017)

Current judges

The most recent to join the court is Lord Richards of Camberwell, who joined on 3 October 2022 in place of Lady Arden of Heswall. In order of seniority, they are as follows:

Acting judges and supplementary panel
Under section 38 of the Constitutional Reform Act, the President of the Court is empowered to request the service of additional judges on the Court, drawn from two categories of people: the first is any person serving as a "senior territorial judge", defined by section 38(8) as a judge of the Court of Appeal of England and Wales, the Inner House of the Court of Session, or the Court of Appeal in Northern Ireland (unless the judge holds the latter office only by virtue of being a puisne judge of the High Court in Northern Ireland). The Lord Judge occasionally sat on cases in the Supreme Court when he was Lord Chief Justice of England and Wales, as did Neuberger when he was Master of the Rolls. Both Reed (prior to his appointment to the Supreme Court) and Lord Clarke, judges of the Court of Session, sat on the Supreme Court during Rodger's last illness.

The second category of additional judges is the supplementary panel: approved Supreme Court justices and territorial judges who have retired from judicial service within the past five years and are younger than 75.

As of 2022 the supplementary panel consists of:
 Lord Hughes of Ombersley (former Justice of the Supreme Court)
 Lady Black of Derwent (former Justice of the Supreme Court)
 Sir Declan Morgan (former Lord Chief Justice of Northern Ireland)

Salary
As of 1 October 2019, Justices of the Supreme Court, including the Deputy President, were in Group 2 of the judicial salary scheme, with an annual salary of £226,193. This is the same group as the Chancellor of the High Court, Lord Justice Clerk, President of the Family Division and President of the King's Bench Division. The President of the Supreme Court, Lord Chief Justice of Northern Ireland, Lord President of the Court of Session and Master of the Rolls make up Group 1.1 of the scale on £234,184, below only the Lord Chief Justice of England and Wales, who earns £262,264.

Style and address
Following a Royal Warrant dated 10 December 2010, all Justices of the Supreme Court who are not already peers are granted the judicial courtesy title of Lord or Lady followed by a surname, territorial designation or a combination of both, for life.  Wives of male Supreme Court justices are styled as if they were wives of peers.

Dress
On ceremonial occasions, such as the State Opening of Parliament, the ceremony at Westminster Abbey to mark the beginning of the judicial year, and at the swearing in of a new member of the Court, the Justices wear ceremonial robes of black silk damask trimmed with gold lace and frogs, in the same pattern as the Lord Chancellor's state robes. The robe has no train, and the flap collar and shoulder caps bear the Supreme Court insignia. 

The Justices do not wear wigs or court dress as others in the legal and official positions do. Lady Hale has taken to wearing a black velvet Tudor bonnet with gold cord and tassel which is the common headwear for doctorates in British academical dress. The robes were made by Ede & Ravenscroft with the embroidery by Hand & Lock.

On other occasions, the Justices wear day dress. This follows the convention adopted by the Appellate Committee of the House of Lords, which was, technically, not a court but a committee of that House.

See also
Senator of the College of Justice
Lord Justice of Appeal
List of Lords Justices of Appeal
High Court judge (England and Wales)
List of High Court judges of England and Wales

References

Notes

External links
The Supreme Court website
Biographies of the Justices
Former Justices